Lingua (Latin, 'tongue') may refer to:

 Lingua (journal), a peer-reviewed academic journal of general linguistics
 Lingua (sculpture), by Jim Sanborn
 Lingua (play), a 17th-century play attributed to Thomas Tomkis
 Project Lingua, an online translation community
 Lingua (indonesian vocal group), an indonesian vocal group.

See also

 Language (disambiguation)
 Linga (disambiguation)
 Lingga (disambiguation)
 Tongue (disambiguation)
 Lingua franca, a common language
 Lingua.ly, an educational technology business